Quido Lanzaat (born 30 September 1979) is a Dutch former footballer who played as a defender.

Career
A product of the AFC Ajax football academy, Lanzaat played in the UEFA Cup and the UEFA Champions League with Ajax.

In early 2000, he moved to Germany to play for Borussia Mönchengladbach. In 2002, he was transferred to Alemannia Aachen with whom he reached the final of the DFB-Pokal in 2004. The same year he was signed by TSV 1860 Munich. In the 2006–07 season he played for MSV Duisburg. In the summer of 2007 he moved to Bulgaria joining CSKA Sofia on a free transfer.

After being released at CSKA Sofia in 2008, Lanzaat went on trial with Aberdeen F.C. in the Scottish Premier League and was close to joining Coventry City in the Coca-Cola Championship after impressing on trial.

On 8 July 2009, he returned to Germany signing a contract with FC Carl Zeiss Jena. Having made just 26 appearances for the club he agreed to terminate his contract with Jena on 25 June 2010.

On the same day of Lanzaat's release from Carl Zeiss Jena, Wehen Wiesbaden announced the signing of the player on a two-year contract.

Personal life
On 11 July 2014, Lanzaat was declared missing. Five days later, he was reported as being alive.

Honours
CSKA Sofia
Bulgarian League: 2007–08

References

External links
 

1979 births
Living people
Dutch footballers
Footballers from Amsterdam
AFC Ajax players
Borussia Mönchengladbach players
Borussia Mönchengladbach II players
Alemannia Aachen players
TSV 1860 Munich players
MSV Duisburg players
PFC CSKA Sofia players
FC Carl Zeiss Jena players
SV Wehen Wiesbaden players
Eredivisie players
Bundesliga players
2. Bundesliga players
3. Liga players
First Professional Football League (Bulgaria) players
Dutch expatriate footballers
Dutch expatriate sportspeople in Bulgaria
Dutch expatriate sportspeople in Germany
Expatriate footballers in Bulgaria
Expatriate footballers in Germany
Association football defenders